Crookt, Crackt, or Fly is the second studio album by American indie rock band Gastr del Sol, released on April 18, 1994 by Drag City. The album was written and performed by David Grubbs and Jim O'Rourke, with John McEntire (percussion), Steve Butters (percussion) and Gene Coleman (bass clarinet) also contributing. It was recorded by Brian Paulson in October 1993 at Kingsize in Chicago.

In 2016, Crookt, Crackt, or Fly was ranked at number 17 on Pastes list of the best post-rock albums. John McEntire's band The Sea and Cake derived their name from his mishearing of the title of the song "The C in Cake".

Track listing

References

External links
 

1994 albums
Gastr del Sol albums
Drag City (record label) albums